Minuscule 633 (in the Gregory-Aland numbering), α 451 (von Soden), is a Greek minuscule manuscript of the New Testament, on paper. Palaeographically it has been assigned to the 14th century. The manuscript is lacunose. Formerly it was labelled by 168a and 205p.

Description 

The codex contains the text of the Acts of the Apostles, Catholic epistles, Pauline epistles, on 204 paper leaves (size ), with only one lacuna (Acts 1:1-7:23). The text is written in one column per page, 40 lines per page.

The order of books: Acts of the Apostles, Catholic epistles, and Pauline epistles. Epistle to the Hebrews is placed after Epistle to Philemon.

Text 

The Greek text of the codex is a representative of the Byzantine text-type. Kurt Aland placed it in Category V.

History 

The manuscript is dated by the INTF to the 14th century.

The manuscript was added to the list of New Testament manuscripts by Johann Martin Augustin Scholz, who slightly examined the manuscript.

Formerly it was labelled by 168a and 205p. In 1908 Gregory gave the number 633 to it.

The manuscript currently is housed at the Biblioteca Vallicelliana (F. 13), at Rome.

See also 

 List of New Testament minuscules
 Biblical manuscript
 Textual criticism

References

Further reading 

 

Greek New Testament minuscules
14th-century biblical manuscripts